Silk Central is a test management software product developed by Micro Focus that is marketed to improve productivity, traceability, and visibility for all types of software testing. Silk Central Test Manager is an open software test management product that supports both responsive and traditional development projects.

References

Quality assurance
Borland
Micro Focus International